Stubbs Road is a road located in Mid-Levels East, Central, Hong Kong, which connects Happy Valley to The Peak area on Hong Kong Island, Hong Kong, through an area near the Wong Nai Chung Gap. It runs uphill from Queen's Road East and goes through a residential area of luxurious high-rise tower blocks. The road is named after the 16th Governor of Hong Kong, Sir Reginald Edward Stubbs.

Features
Stubbs Road is an example of the city's "cultural diversity": one of Hong Kong's tallest residential buildings, Highcliff, and the historical Chinese style building, King Yin Lei, are situated on this road.

Opus Hong Kong, a 12-story residential block designed by Frank Gehry is located on 53 Stubbs Road. The location on Stubbs Road has been owned by the Swire Group for 60 years. It originally was the home of the most senior executive in Swire.

Hong Kong Adventist Hospital is located along the road.

See also
 Lingnan Primary School
 Khalsa Diwan Sikh Temple
 List of streets and roads in Hong Kong
 Stone wall trees in Hong Kong
 Rosaryhill School
 Bradbury School

References

Wan Chai District
Roads on Hong Kong Island